Basque pelota competitions at the 2023 Pan American Games in Santiago, Chile are scheduled to be held at the Spanish Stadium located in Las Condes between October 31 and November 5, 2023.

Eight medal events are scheduled to be contested, two singles and two doubles events for men and women.

Qualification

A total of 66 athletes (33 per gender) will qualify to compete. Each nation may enter a maximum of 12 athletes (six per gender). The host country (Chile) automatically qualified a full team of 12 athletes. There will be a total of two qualification events. The best ranked country of the Americas in each event of the Biarritz 2022 Absolute World Basque
Pelota Championship will secure a spot. The second event is the 2023 Pan American Basque Pelota Tournament, in which 21 men and 21 women will be qualified.

Participating nations
A total of 4 countries qualified athletes so far.

Medal summary

Medalists

Men's events

Women's events

References 

 
Events at the 2023 Pan American Games
2023
Pan American Games